The Departament of Federal Police (Portuguese: DPF) is a federal law enforcement agency of Brazil and one of the three national police forces. The other two are the Federal Highway Police, and the National Force. From 1944 to 1967 it was called the Federal Public Safety Department (Portuguese: Departamento Federal de Segurança Pública).

The Federal Police Department is responsible for combating crimes against federal institutions, international drug trafficking, terrorism, cyber-crime, organized crime, public corruption, white-collar crime, money laundering, immigration, border control, airport security and maritime policing. It is subordinate to the Ministry of Justice and Public Security.

Legal authority

The Federal Police's mandate was established in the first paragraph of Article 144 of the Brazilian Constitution, which assigns it the following roles:
To investigate criminal offenses against political and social order, or against goods, services and interests of Brazilian federal government, its organs and companies, as well as interstate and international crime in a need of uniform repression in Brazil;
To prevent and repress smuggling and drug trafficking;
To be Brazil's maritime police, air transport enforcement agency, immigration agency and border patrol;
To combat federal and interstate crime.

Other federal statutes give the Federal Police the authority and responsibility to:
Prevent and combat terrorism;
Ensure the safety of foreign heads of state and heads of international organizations when visiting Brazil;
Investigate cyber crime;
Represent the International Police (Interpol) in Brazil;
Prevent and repress crime against indigenous people;
Investigate and repress public corruption and white-collar crime;
Investigate and repress organized crime
Regulate, via licensing, the sale, possession, and transportation of firearms and ammunition by civilian people in Brazil;
Prevent crimes against the environment.
Manage the national database of criminal's genetic profiles;
Prevent and process the violation of human rights and civil rights;
Investigate and repress money laundering;
Assist the other Brazilian's police on investigations, when requested
Run a witness protection program

History

In March 1944, the police department of the Federal District in Rio de Janeiro was transformed into the "Departamento Federal de Segurança Pública" (Federal Department of Public Safety), or DFSP. The aim was to create a police with jurisdiction in the whole country, not just in its original state. Despite its name change, initially the DFSP only served in the Federal District, but acted at the national level as the maritime police.

In the first half of 1946, the DFSP was given national jurisdiction, especially in cases of the illegal narcotics trade and crimes against public faith, and in the interest of national finance. However, a new constitution drafted on September 18 gave states the power to meet their needs of government and administration.

When the federal capital moved in 1960, the DFSP moved to Brasília, providing Guanabara State with their public security services and personnel. Due to a shortage of staff, the DFSP had to be restructured, merging its staff with another local security agency from Brasilia, called the Special Guard of Brasilia (GEB). Afterwards, the DFSP improved its structure to mimic the model of the United States FBI and police forces in England and Canada, as well as to expand operations throughout the whole Brazilian territory.  Also in 1967, the new Brazilian Constitution changed the agency name to Departamento de Policia Federal (Department of Federal Police) through art.210 of Decree-Law No. 200 of February 25, 1967. As a federal investigation agency, the mainly idea after the 1960s was to mold the Federal Police into the shape and effectiveness of the American FBI. In 1996, all positions in the Federal Police came to require a bachelor's degree.

Organization

With an area of expertise that covers all national territory, the Federal Police adopts a structure similar to that of the state Civil Police forces throughout the country, but with an administrative structure that allows planning, coordination and centralized control with decentralized execution. Integration with the other federal and state government agencies on a routine basis occur through formal requests, but eventually there is a high level of coordination.
The Director-General provides accounting and technical support agencies in Brasília, entrusted with the tasks of planning, coordination and control.

For the operational activities, the PF has 27 regional superintendents (the office in a state capital), 95 Federal Police offices (called Delegacias), 12 border outposts, 12 maritime (or riverine) bases and 2 bases on inland waterways.

The Federal Police Commissioners command investigations, request search and arrest warrants, decide on the arrest of a criminal etc. The field investigations and operational services are performed by the Federal Agents (Agentes de Polícia Federal). The agency also has Forensic specialists (Peritos Criminais Federais), Notary Agents (Escrivães de Polícia Federal) and fingerprints specialists (Papiloscopistas Policiais Federais). 
A bachelor's degree is required for candidates to apply for any position in Federal Police. Commissioners must have a law degree. No previous police experience is required for any jobs. Candidates applying for a position as Federal Agent, Notary Agent and Fingerprints specialist, are required to have a bachelor's degree in any area. Candidates applying for Forensics specialists should have specific degrees, depending on their area of expertise, such as Civil Engineering, Veterinary, Accounting and Chemistry degrees.

Admission tests for the Federal Police have one of the highest candidates per spot ratio in the country.

Tactical Operations Command

The Comando de Operações Táticas'' (COT; English: Tactical Operations Command) of the Federal Police was created in 1987 by the Ministry of Justice through the Federal Police Department – DPF with a mission of responding to terrorist attacks inside the country. To do so, its members were trained in technical and tactical units of the Special Armed Forces in Brazil and abroad – in special units in the U.S., France and Germany (especially by GSG 9). Today, this elite force for armed action plays a large range of operations.

Throughout its existence, the COT has participated in several high risk missions such as drug seizures in the country, expropriation actions, rural conflicts, VIP security, dismantling of criminal organizations, and is commonly used to escort high risk prisoners.

To belong to the COT the applicant must be in the ranks of the Federal Police. The training involving tactical and physical disciplines are practiced with the same intensity of the Training Course of the National Police Academy – ANP, including training by other specialized forces in the country, such as Rio de Janeiro's Military Police elite group called Batalhão de Operações Policiais Especiais (BOPE) specialized in urban operations.

The headquarters of the COT is in Brasília, in an area of 40 thousand square meters, located in Police Sector South, from where they send operators for missions throughout the country.

Marine Police
The Special Center of Maritime Police (Núcleo Especial de Polícia Marítima – NEPOM) was created in twelve Brazilian cities in response to the high rate of crime in Brazilian ports, as well as the need to ostensibly patrol to prevent the occurrence of criminal offenses in Amazonian rivers and Brazilian borders (especially Itaipu Lake on the Brazil-Paraguay border). The maritime policing has the latest equipment, recently acquired by the Brazilian government in order to meet the country to the ISPS Code standards (International Ship and Port Facility Security Code). In addition to the routine patrolling, surveillance is carried out in the international traffic in dozens of ships docking and undocking in major Brazilian ports. Agents of action is also taken around the clandestine coming on board vessels. The Nepom the police receive special training in the Navy of Brazil, and is enabled in the category of Crew of State vessel.

Operational Aviation Coordination
The CAOP (Coordenação de Aviação Operacional – Aviation Operational Coordination) is a unit of federal police agents, responsible for transporting policeman to anywhere in the country, besides the air support operations to the Federal Police.

Was established in 1986, because the demand for transportation to any place, quickly, and the need for air support in the actions and tactics without having to depend on the Armed Forces.

In 1995 the corporation had the name of advising operational issues when he received three aircraft, two Bell 412 and an HB-350 Squirrel. Already in 1996 the Office became the Division of Aviation Operations. In the year 1999 the unit won these assignments and in 2001 finally received the current designation of CAOP.

The unit is divided into two squadrons, one fixed-wing and the other rotorcraft.

Its current fleet includes:

Equipment

The Federal Police Department issues all agents graduating from the National Police Academy either a Glock 17, Glock 19 or Glock 26 according to the agent's preference. Other equipment include the M4 carbine, HK G36K, HK MP5, HK416, HK417, MR308, SG 550, Blaser R93 Tactical and the FN MAG.

Vehicles

See also
 National Prison Department (Brazil)
 Military Police of Brazilian States
 Military Police of São Paulo State
 Military Police of Rio de Janeiro State
 Law enforcement in Brazil
 Federal Highway Police (Brazil)
 Civil Police of Brazilian States
 Civil Police of São Paulo State
 Civil Police of Rio de Janeiro State

Notes

External links

  

Federal law enforcement agencies of Brazil
Government agencies established in 1944
1944 establishments in Brazil